The Gubbins band was a group of footpads, sheep-stealers, beggars, cutpurses, cut-throats and highwaymen who inhabited the area around Lydford in Devon around the time of the English Civil War. Their leader, one Roger Rowle, has been variously characterised both as a blackhearted villain and as the Robin Hood of Dartmoor. The Gubbins band is  depicted in Charles Kingsley's novel Westward Ho!. They also appear in the novel Warleigh by Anna Eliza Bray.

Further reading
United Devon Association. The Book of Fair Devon. Exeter, 1900.

External links
Legendary Dartmoor: The Gubbins' (sic) of Lydford

English outlaws
Outlaw gangs
People from the Borough of West Devon